TimeSplitters is a first-person shooter video game developed by Free Radical Design and published by Eidos Interactive. It is the first game in the TimeSplitters series. It was released on 26 October 2000 in North America and 24 November 2000 in Europe as a PlayStation 2 launch title. The game revolves around the concept of travelling through time in a story mode spanning 100 years. The game features a story mode, arcade mode, unlockable challenge mode, and map maker.

Gameplay and premise
 
As a first-person shooter game, TimeSplitters bears several gameplay and presentational similarities to GoldenEye 007 and Perfect Dark, including a similar aiming system and unlockable options through quick level completions. The game's story mode can be played alone or co-operatively with one additional player. Every level in story mode can be played on three difficulty settings; several aspects, such as the enemies' aggressiveness and the addition of new areas, can vary in function of the chosen difficulty.

Taking place at nine fictional locations between 1935 and 2035, the story follows 18 characters' individual attempts at defeating their own foes and the TimeSplitters with whom they have sided. In each level, the player can choose from one of two characters specific to each mission, and must kill enemies as they move through the level to retrieve an object and then carry that object to the exit portal. After a player picks up the object, the TimeSplitters – evil mutant creatures – spawn endlessly throughout the level and attack the player.

TimeSplitters features a multiplayer mode, known as "Arcade", where up to four players and ten computer-controlled bots can compete individually, or in up to four different teams in certain modes. There are six multiplayer modes and aspects of each mode — such as the weapons and levels available, the winning condition, and managing characters — can be customized to match player preference. Completing the story mode on the easiest difficulty unlocks "Challenge Mode", which provide certain goals on a pre-set map within the time limit.

The game contains a level editor that allows the player to create their own level from a selection of various pre-made tiles. Light settings of the tiles can be edited individually and items can be added to the map. The map can be given any one of five themes; these themes change the interior shape of the tiles and their appearance. The player can also play and test their levels in any certain multiplayer modes, as well as saving them to their memory card.

Development and release 
In February 1999, several members of the GoldenEye 007 and Perfect Dark development team — including David Doak, Steve Ellis, Karl Hilton and Graeme Norgate — left Rare to form their own company based in Nottingham, England called Free Radical Design. TimeSplitters was the first project for Free Radical Design team, and the development was carried out by eighteen people. Graeme Norgate composed the music for TimeSplitters. The game was developed in 16 months with a budget of £500,000

David Doak, the designer of TimeSplitters, said that the team focused on "action-based gameplay, but there are many other elements" and stated that the game would be "using both analog controls on the DualShock 2 and all of the controls will be fully customizable." The team additionally included a "sign-on" system, which saves individual player profile and preferences stored on the memory card. Because of the PlayStation 2's hardware limitations, Steve Ellis explained that "[g]etting a four-way split screen working at a good frame rate is a problem on any console, and the PS2 is no exception". The team did not use anti-aliasing for TimeSplitters as it would reduce the frame rate drastically.

TimeSplitters was released in North America on 23 October 2000 and in Europe on 24 November 2000, as a launch game for the PlayStation 2. As part of the Platinum Range, it was re-released on 8 March 2002.

Reception 

Garrett Kenyon reviewed the PlayStation 2 version of the game for Next Generation, rating it four stars out of five, and stated that "True fans of the FPS genre will enjoy TimeSplitters for its straightforward presentation and simple trigger-pulling appeal." It was a runner-up for GameSpots annual "Best Shooting Game" award among console games, which went to Perfect Dark.

TimeSplitters received generally favourable reviews according to the review aggregation website Metacritic. Edge praised the game's fluid and action-packed multiplayer mode, comparing it favourably to the Quake series, and credited the artificial intelligence of enemies for being relentless, especially during multiplayer matches.

References

External links

TimeSplitters
2000 video games
First-person shooters
Free Radical Design
Multiplayer and single-player video games
PlayStation 2 games
PlayStation 2-only games
Video games about police officers
Video games about time travel
Video games about zombies
Video games developed in the United Kingdom
Video games featuring female protagonists
Video games scored by Graeme Norgate
Video games set in 1935
Video games set in 1965
Video games set in 1970
Video games set in 1985
Video games set in 2000
Video games set in 2005
Video games set in 2020
Video games set in Egypt
Video games set in San Francisco
Video games set in the 1950s
Video games set in the 2030s
Video games set on fictional planets
Video games with user-generated gameplay content